Thomas Dundas, 2nd Earl of Zetland, KG (5 February 1795 – 6 May 1873), was a British nobleman and politician.

Born in Marylebone, London, eldest son of the 1st Earl and his wife Harriet Hale, he was educated at Harrow and Trinity College, Cambridge. In 1818 he was elected Whig Member of Parliament for his father and grandfather's old seat of Richmond, becoming representative for York twelve years later. In 1835 he returned to Parliament as member for Richmond, and four years later succeeded his father as second Earl of Zetland.

Like his father a prominent freemason, Lord Zetland was the United Grand Lodge of England's Grand Master from 1844 to 1870. Zetland was a senior member of the Jockey Club and won The Derby and St Leger Stakes with his horse Voltigeur in 1850.

In the year of his succession to the earldom, he was appointed Lord Lieutenant and Custos Rotulorum of the North Riding of Yorkshire, and in 1861 became a Knight of the Thistle. He resigned the Order on being made a Knight of the Garter in 1872, and died the following year at Aske Hall, Yorkshire.

He married, on 6 September 1823, Sophia Jane, daughter of Sir Hedworth Williamson, Bt.

References 

 Lodge, Edmund, Norroy King of Arms, The Peerage of the British Empire, London, 1858, p. 607.

External links

1795 births
1873 deaths
Alumni of Trinity College, Cambridge
British racehorse owners and breeders
Earls in the Peerage of the United Kingdom
Knights of the Garter
Knights of the Thistle
Lord-Lieutenants of the North Riding of Yorkshire
Dundas, Thomas
People from Marylebone
Dundas, Thomas
Dundas, Thomas
Dundas, Thomas
Dundas, Thomas
Dundas, Thomas
Dundas, Thomas
Dundas, Thomas
Dundas, Thomas
Dundas, Thomas Dundas, Lord
Zetland, E2
Grand Masters of the United Grand Lodge of England
Owners of Epsom Derby winners
People educated at Harrow School